Euzophera hulli is a species of snout moth in the genus Euzophera. It was described by Jan Asselbergs in 2009 and is known from Turkey.

References

Moths described in 2009
Phycitini
Endemic fauna of Turkey
Moths of Asia